Li Ling (died 74 BC) was a Han dynasty general who later defected and served the Xiongnu.

Li Ling and Ling Li may also refer to:

 People surnamed Li
 Li Ling (sinologist) (born 1948), Chinese sinologist
 Li Ling (paralympian) (born 1967), Chinese paralympic track and field athlete
 Li Ling (shot putter) (born 1985), Chinese shot putter
 Li Ling (sailor) (born 1986), Chinese windsurfer
 Li Ling (pole vaulter) (born 1989), Chinese pole vaulter
 Li Ling (netball player) (born 1987), Chinese-born Singaporean netball player
 Li Ling (actress)

 People surnamed Ling
 Ling Li (writer) (1942–2018), Chinese writer and historian

See also
Liling, a county-level city in Hunan, China